Platystemma is a genus of flowering plants belonging to the family Gesneriaceae.

Its native range is Indian subcontinent to Southern Central China and Peninsula Malaysia.

Species:
 Platystemma violoides Wall.

References

Didymocarpoideae
Gesneriaceae genera